Rael Bertarelli Gimenes Toffolo (born March 18, 1976) is a Brazilian musician, composer and musicologist born in São Paulo.

Education 
Toffolo holds a Bachelor of Music in composition and conducting from the Universidade Estadual Paulista as well a master's degree in Musicology  He is also professor in composition and musical theory at the Universidade Estadual de Maringá. His work as a researcher is in the field of Ecological Psychology, Neural Nets, Artificial Intelligence, and Cognitive Science applied to musical composition.

Career 
Toffolo works within contemporary classical music. He has composed for various formations including chamber music, solo instruments and electroacoustic music.

List of works
Tempesta di Mare (2011)
O resto no copo (2010)
Sturm und Drang (2010)
Estudo para violão (2008)
Mutazione (2008)
El mar y las campanas (2008)
Beethoven através do Espelho I (2008)
2 Estudos para piano (2005)
Af for dance (2004)
Beethoven através do espelho - inventio (2005)
Sem Título, lápis sobre papel, técnica mista (2001)
Peça para Voz e percussão Múltipla (2000)
Peça para grupo instrumental (2000)
O Tempo da Espiral (2000)
Omaggio? (2000) - para sons eletroacústicos
Peça Para Piano e Percussão (1999)
Seven Ocean Waves
Anhatomirin (1996)

Awards 
 Second Place (tie) for solo flute - National Competition Rhythm and Sound - UNESP - work with Ocean Waves Seven (1998)
 Third Place - 1st International Electroacoustic Composition Contest - State Conservatory "Juscelino Kubitschek de Oliveira" to work for Af Dance (2006)
 Award for Classical Composition of Funarte bass and real-time processing with the work on The Rest Cup 2010

References

1976 births
Living people
Brazilian composers
São Paulo State University alumni